The Beaver Historic District is a historic district in Beaver, Pennsylvania, United States. Listed on the National Register of Historic Places on October 24, 1996, it is centered on Beaver's commercial Third Street and the area around it. The buildings in the district date primarily to the nineteenth century, although some twentieth-century structures are present.  Some of the district's most prominent buildings are five churches and the county courthouse, although most of the district consists of residential neighborhoods.  Included in the boundaries of the district is the Matthew S. Quay House, the National Historic Landmark home of Beaver native Senator Matthew Quay, and the site of Fort McIntosh, a fort constructed in the 1780s.

References

Geography of Beaver County, Pennsylvania
Historic districts on the National Register of Historic Places in Pennsylvania
National Register of Historic Places in Beaver County, Pennsylvania